James Barclay (born 1965) is a British fantasy author.

James or Jim Barclay may also refer to:

 James Barclay, eighteenth century English banker, namesake of Barclays Bank
 James A. Barclay (1923–2011), Scottish Canadian oil industry scientist and executive, golfer, and golf historian
 James William Barclay (1832–1907), Scottish businessman
 Colonel James Barclay, a fictional character in "The Adventure of the Crooked Man", a Sherlock Holmes story by Sir Arthur Conan Doyle
 James Turner Barclay, American missionary and explorer of Palestine

 James Barclay (priest) (died 1750), Canon of Windsor
 James Lent Barclay (1848–1925), American member of New York society during the Gilded Age
 James Barclay (minister), minister of the Church of Scotland and footballer
 Jim Barclay (politician) (1882–1972), New Zealand politician
 Jim Barclay (comedian)
 Jim Barclay (field hockey)

See also
 James Barkley, American artist
James R. Barkley, Iowa politician
 James Berkeley (disambiguation)